Camden is a city in and the county seat of Ouachita County in the south-central part of the U.S. state of Arkansas. The city is located about 100 miles south of Little Rock. Situated on bluffs overlooking the Ouachita River, the city developed because of the river. The recorded history began in 1782 when a Spanish military post was established on the site of an old French trading post called Écore à Fabri. When Ouachita County was formed in 1842, American settlers changed the name to Camden. The city became an important port during the steamboat era when Camden became known as the “Queen City” of the Ouachita. In 1864, Camden became the unintended focus of the Red River Campaign, a major Civil War effort resulting in several significant battles. Camden is known as the producer of  M142 HIMARS (High Mobility Artillery Rocket System) produced by Lockheed Martin. 

In 2000, Camden had a population of 13,154, but it lost 7.4 percent of its residents and recorded 12,183 in 2010. Camden is the principal city of the Camden Micropolitan Statistical Area, which includes all of Ouachita and Calhoun counties.

History

European exploration 
The explorers Father Jacques Marquette and Louis Joliet in 1673 and René-Robert Cavelier, Sieur de La Salle, in 1682 established French claims to the land they called Louisiana, which included what would become Camden, and found the Quapaw living at the confluence of the Arkansas and Mississippi rivers. The Quapaw claimed the territory that included this part of the Ouachita basin, but it was also influenced by both Caddo trade and culture. The old Indian trail called the Caddo Trace, leading from the Quapaw villages on the Arkansas River to those of the Caddo on the Red River, crossed the Ouachita River at what is now Camden. French hunters, trappers, and traders, who were drawn to the area by the abundant game, later established a rendezvous point on the high bluff above the crossing. The place became known as Ecore a Fabri or Fabri's Bluff (later spelled Fabre).

In late 1762, France ceded Louisiana to Spain. In 1782, the Spanish governor sent a Frenchman named Jean Baptiste Filhiol, known to him as Don Juan Filhiol, to establish a civil and military post in the Ouachita district. Filhiol first chose to locate his headquarters at Ecore a Fabri with the expectation of creating a settlement there. After about two years, he decided to move downriver to the more central site of Prairie des Canots, present-day Monroe, Louisiana. These locations were noted in 1804 by the Hunter-Dunbar Expedition that explored the Ouachita River.

Early statehood 
By 1819, Jesse Bowman, of future Alamo fame, was living at Ecore a Fabri, while the Tate brothers—Andrew, Richard, and George—came up the Ouachita on keelboats. Unable to go farther, they settled up river at a place now called Tate's Bluff. In 1824, John Nunn moved to Ecore a Fabri and became one of the early permanent settlers. The Nunn brothers planned to pole freight and passengers upriver toward Washington, Arkansas. Steamboats arrived at Ecore a Fabri in the 1820s and provided it with a direct link to the cotton and commercial markets in New Orleans. Because it was located at the head of practical navigation, Ecore a Fabri became a commercial center and began to grow. Residents of Hempstead County began petitioning for a new road in 1821, and by 1828, the Camden to Washington Road was having additional work and maintenance done. By 1829, a large portion of Hempstead County, including Ecore a Fabri, was broken off by the legislature to form an expanded Union County. In 1842, Ouachita County, named for the river, was formed from the northwest portion of Union. Ecore a Fabri was chosen as the county seat, and its name was changed to Camden at the suggestion of one of the commissioners, Thomas Woodward.

Camden soon became the second-largest city in Arkansas. It was a mercantile center and a bustling river port served by frequent scheduled steamboats carrying passengers and freight. Most traveled between Camden and New Orleans. Camden was also the headquarters for John T. Chidester's stagecoach line that served Arkansas, Louisiana and Texas. Chidester's company carried the United States Mail from Memphis to Fort Smith for the Butterfield stage line.

American Civil War 

During the Civil War, Camden was the focus of U.S. Army general Frederick Steele’s Red River Campaign of 1864. Steele moved south of Little Rock toward Shreveport, Louisiana, but got only as far as Camden, which he occupied while the Confederates pulled back to defend Washington, Arkansas. Forts Lookout and Southerland were built early in 1864, and the Camden Water Battery was built later in the same year, all to protect Camden from attack. After losing the engagement at Poison Spring and the action at Marks’ Mill, Steele had little choice but to retreat toward Little Rock. Camden and south Arkansas remained in Confederate hands until the end of the war.

20th century to present 
Before the steamboat era faded, Camden had become a railroad town—served by the mainline of the St Louis-Southwestern Railroad (Cotton Belt) and by branch lines of the Missouri Pacific and the Rock Island railroads. The town remained an important cotton shipping depot through the early decades of the twentieth century. The South Arkansas oil boom of the 1920s resulted in a thriving economy.

In 1927, the International Paper Company built a processing mill at Camden, following development of south Arkansas' lumber industry. For several decades, Camden was the headquarters of the Clyde E. Palmer newspaper chain, which included The Camden News, the Texarkana Gazette, the Hot Springs Sentinel-Record, and the Magnolia Banner News. The daily newspaper in Camden is the original flagship publication of WEHCO Media.

During World War II, Camden was home to one of Arkansas's three contract training fields for primary pilots in the United States Army Air Forces. The base was named Harrell Field; ground was broken for it in 1942.  The site became surplus to the Army's needs in 1944 and was handed over to the US Navy for the Shumaker Naval Ammunition Depot.
Thousands of new jobs were created. The Korean War generated new jobs and activity at the depot, which closed after war's end. The city and county redeveloped its facilities and grounds into an extensive industrial area. This was the site of some major defense establishments and multiple smaller industries. A technical campus of Southern Arkansas University is also located there.

In the 1990s, post Cold War downsizing of the defense industry brought severe job losses—and resulting population decline—to the Camden area.  The International Paper Company mill closed a few years later, resulting in more job losses. In recent years, however, a partial resurgence of defense contracts and the development of a diversified mixture of small business and professional activity have stabilized the town's economy.

Camden is the home of Buckshot Smith who, at the age of 91, has been America's oldest active duty police officer since 2020.

Ukraine has a significant demand for all of the rockets and missiles made at the Lockheed Martin Missiles and Fire Control facility in neighboring East Camden, including those used by the Army's Patriot missile system.

Geography 
Camden is located on the Ouachita River, at the end of the navigable part of the river.

Climate 
The climate in this area is characterized by hot summers and cool winters.  According to the Köppen Climate Classification system, Camden has a humid subtropical climate, abbreviated "Cfa" on climate maps.

Demographics

2020 census

As of the 2020 United States census, there were 10,612 people, 4,221 households, and 2,523 families residing in the city.

2010 census
As of the 2010 United States Census, there were 12,183 people living in the city. The racial makeup of the city was 55.9% Black, 40.0% White, 0.3% Native American, 0.5% Asian, <0.1% Pacific Islander, 0.1% from some other race and 1.6% from two or more races. 1.6% were Hispanic or Latino of any race.

2000 census
As of the census of 2000, there were 13,154 people, 5,421 households, and 3,561 families living in the city. The racial makeup of the city was 48.88% Black or African American, 49.41% White, 0.37% Asian, 0.24% Native American, 0.02% Pacific Islander, 0.20% from other races, and 0.87% from two or more races. 0.58% of the population were Hispanic or Latino of any race.

There were 5,421 households, out of which 30.0% had children under the age of 18 living with them, 42.6% were married couples living together, 19.4% had a female householder with no husband present, and 34.3% were non-families.  31.5% of all households were made up of individuals, and 16.0% had someone living alone who was 65 years of age or older. The average household size was 2.36 and the average family size was 2.97.

In the city, the population was spread out, with 26.2% under the age of 18, 8.1% from 18 to 24, 24.6% from 25 to 44, 21.7% from 45 to 64, and 19.4% who were 65 years of age or older. The median age was 39 years. For every 100 females, there were 82.0 males. For every 100 females age 18 and over, there were 76.4 males.

The median income for a household in the city was $27,814, and the median income for a family was $35,291. Males had a median income of $31,257 versus $19,046 for females. The per capita income for the city was $14,599. About 18.5% of families and 22.5% of the population were below the poverty line, including 32.0% of those under age 18 and 19.4% of those age 65 or over.

Economy

Tourism 

Attractions in town include the McCollum-Chidester House, home to the Ouachita County Historical Society,. Built in 1847 by local merchant Peter McCollum, the house was purchased by John T. Chidester in 1857 and was used as a way station on his stage line. It was featured in the television series North and South.

Camden has numerous historic buildings. There are two National Register districts. The Clifton and Greening Streets Historic District was created in 1997, and the Washington Street Historic District in 2010. The old Camden Post Office, built 1895, was added to the register in 1977. It is now a popular restaurant. The oldest continually running restaurant in the state of Arkansas is also located in Camden. The White House Cafe was opened in 1907 by Hristos Hodjopulas.

About  to the northwest, the site of the Battle of Poison Springs is preserved at Poison Springs Battleground State Park, one of three state parks commemorating the campaign. Oakland Cemetery, which is on the National Register of Historic Places, is the largest Confederate cemetery in the area. Artifacts related to two famous Camden products, Camark pottery and Grapette soft drinks, as well as Civil War and railroad relics, are exhibited at the Camden Visitors Center and Museum. Two major events held in the city are the spring Camden Daffodil Festival and autumn BPW Barn Sale. Other area attractions include White Oak Lake State Park; the Arkansas Museum of Natural Resources at Smackover, and El Dorado.

Education 
Camden was once served by Camden School District and Fairview School District. In 1990 the two districts merged. Public education for early childhood, elementary and secondary education is available from the following school districts:

 Camden Fairview School District, including Camden Fairview High School. 
 Harmony Grove School District, including Harmony Grove High School.

Notable people 
 Shawn Andrews (born 1982); played for Philadelphia Eagles 2004-2009 and NY Giants 2010
 Stacy Andrews (born 1981); played for Cincinnati Bengals 2004–2008, Philadelphia Eagles 2009, Seattle Seahawks 2010, NY Giants 2011
 Jonathan Davis (born 1992), drafted by Toronto Blue Jays 2013; played in minor leagues before a brief stint on Jay's major league roster 2019
 Betty Jo Dobbs (1930–1994), science historian specializing in Newton's Alchemy
 Alexander Hawthorn (1825–1899); American lawyer, minister, C.S. Army general
 George Hays (1863–1927), 24th governor of Arkansas 1913–1917
 Benjamin Laney (1896–1977), 33rd governor of Arkansas 1945–1949
 Ne-Yo (born 1979 as Shaffer Chimere Smith); R&B singer, songwriter, producer
 Andre Patterson (born 1960); defensive line coach (NFL) 1997–2006, with Minnesota Vikings since 2014
 David Pryor (born 1934); served as U.S. Representative 1967–1973, 39th governor of Arkansas 1974–1979, U.S. Senator 1979–1997.
 Tony Tillman (born 1981 as Tony Daniel Frazier), Christian hip hop artist and songwriter
 Tommy Tuberville (born 1954); head football coach for University of Mississippi, Auburn 1999–2008, Texas Tech and University of Cincinnati, U.S. senator from Alabama
 David Warner Hagen (1931-2022), United States District Court judge
 Gertrude Weaver (1898–2015); declared oldest living documented person, but died five days later on April 6, 2015
 Corey Williams (born 1980); played for GB Packers 2004–2007, Cleveland Browns 2008–2009, Detroit Lions 2010–2012

See also 

 List of cities and towns in Arkansas
 National Register of Historic Places listings in Ouachita County, Arkansas

References

External links 

 Government

 General information

Camden Expedition Civil War Trail at Arkansas Department of Parks & Tourism
Camden Area Chamber of Commerce

 
1844 establishments in Arkansas
Camden, Arkansas micropolitan area
Cities in Arkansas
Cities in Ouachita County, Arkansas
County seats in Arkansas
Populated places established in 1844
Arkansas populated places on the Ouachita River